is a passenger railway station located in the city of Kakogawa, Hyōgo Prefecture, Japan, operated by the West Japan Railway Company (JR West).

Lines

Station layout
The station consists of one ground-level side platform and one island platform connected by an elevated station building. The station has a Midori no Madoguchi staffed ticket office

Platforms

History
Higashi-Kakogawa Station opened on October 1, 1961. With the privatization of the Japan National Railways (JNR) on April 1, 1987, the station came under the aegis of the West Japan Railway Company.

Station numbering was introduced in March 2018 with Higashi-Kakogawa being assigned station number JR-A78.

Passenger statistics
In fiscal 2019, the station was used by an average of 13,820 passengers daily

Surrounding area
 Japan National Route 2
 Kakogawa Municipal Hiraoka Junior High School
 Kakogawa City Hiraoka Minami Junior High School
 Hyogo Prefectural Higashi Harima High School

See also
List of railway stations in Japan

References

External links

 JR West Station Official Site

Railway stations in Hyōgo Prefecture
Sanyō Main Line
Railway stations in Japan opened in 1961
Kakogawa, Hyōgo